Sir John de Wisham (died 1332) of Little Ellingham, was an English knight and administrator who served as Constable of St Briavels Castle, Justice of North Wales, Seneschal of Gascony (1324–1325) and Captain of Berwick-upon-Tweed (1316).

Life
Wisham was a son of Ralph de Wisham and Emilia. John held the position of Captain of Berwick-upon-Tweed between 13 June 1316 and 1 July 1317. He held the position of Steward of the Household to King Edward III of England.

Appointed on 18 November 1324, replacing Ralph Basset of Drayton, as Seneschal of Gascony, Wisham held the position for less than one year before being replaced by Henri de Sully on 14 August 1325. He died in 1332 and was buried at Clifton-upon-Teme Church, Worcestershire, England.

Marriage and issue
He was married to Hawise, the widow of John de Reydon, she was the daughter of Michael de Poynings and Margery Bardolf, and they are known to have had the following known issue:
John de Wisham, married Joan, had issue.

Notes

References

Year of birth unknown
1332 deaths
Seneschals of Gascony
14th-century English people
Medieval English knights